Typhlonyphia is a monotypic genus of European sheet weavers containing the single species, Typhlonyphia reimoseri. It was first described by J. Kratochvíl in 1936, and is only found in Europe.

See also
 List of Linyphiidae species (Q–Z)

References

Linyphiidae
Monotypic Araneomorphae genera